Lead Vocalist is a compilation album released by Rod Stewart on 22 February 1993 (see 1993 in music). It was released by Warner Bros. Records in the UK (WX 503) and Germany (WEA 9362 45258-1/2), but was never released in the US.  Three songs from this album either had previously or would be released as singles: "Tom Traubert's Blues", "Shotgun Wedding", and "Ruby Tuesday".

Album information
Lead Vocalist was released on the heels of Stewart receiving the Outstanding Contribution or Lifetime Achievement Award at the BRITs. "I Ain't Superstitious" was released while Sterling was with The Jeff Beck Group, "Cindy Incidentally", and "Stay with Me" and "Sweet Lady Mary" had all been released on Faces albums.  

Lead Vocalist closes with five new releases – all cover versions.  The new releases were recorded at Woodstock House in County Wicklow, Ireland and Cherokee Studios in Los Angeles.

Track listing
"I Ain't Superstitious" (Willie Dixon) (Previously released on Truth by The Jeff Beck Group) – 4:53
"Handbags and Gladrags" (Mike D'Abo) (Previously released on An Old Raincoat Won't Ever Let You Down) – 4:25
"Cindy Incidentally" [Rod Stewart, Ron Wood, Ian McLagan) (Previously released on Ooh La La by Faces) – 2:37
"Stay with Me" (Rod Stewart, Ron Wood) (Previously released on A Nod Is as Good as a Wink...To a Blind Horse by Faces) – 4:37
"True Blue" (Rod Stewart, Ron Wood) (Previously released on Never a Dull Moment) – 3:32
"Sweet Lady Mary" (Ronnie Lane, Rod Stewart, Ron Wood) (Previously released on Long Player by Faces) – 5:48
"Hot Legs" (Rod Stewart, Gary Grainger) (Previously released on Foot Loose & Fancy Free) – 5:15
"Stand Back" (Stevie Nicks) – 5:44
"Ruby Tuesday" (Mick Jagger, Keith Richards) – 4:04
"Shotgun Wedding" (Roy C) – 3:30
"First I Look at the Purse" (Smokey Robinson, Bobby Rogers) – 4:23
"Tom Traubert's Blues" (Tom Waits) –6:12

Personnel
For Tracks 1-7 see the original recordings

Tracks 8-12

Rod Stewart – lead vocals, backing vocals
Jeff Golub – guitar
Robin LeMesurier – guitar
Tim Pierce – guitar
Paul Jackson Jr. – guitar
Jeff Baxter – guitar
Waddy Wachtel – guitar
Carmine Rojas – bass guitar
John Pierce – bass guitar
Trevor Horn – bass guitar, backing vocals
Dave Palmer – drums
Eric Caudieux – drums, money jangler
Kevin Savigar – keyboards, piano
Anne Dudley – keyboards, string & horn arrangements
Nicky Hopkins – keyboards
Paulinho Da Costa – percussion
Jimmy Roberts – saxophone
The J.B. Horns – saxophone
Jimmy Zavala – harmonica
Mr. Hunter – shotgun
Alicia Irving, Joseph Powell, Rob Dickins, Arnold Stiefel, The Waters – backing vocals

Production

Tracks 8-12 produced by Trevor Horn
Executive Producer – Rob Dickins
Engineer – Steve MacMillan, Tim Weidner
Assistant Engineer – Lorcan Keogh

Charts

Weekly charts

Year-end charts

References

External links
http://www.rodstewartfanclub.com/about_rod/disco/album_detail.php?album_id=34

Albums produced by Trevor Horn
1993 compilation albums
Warner Records compilation albums
Rod Stewart compilation albums